The Maritime Quarter (including Swansea Marina) is a residential area of Swansea, Wales, UK located immediately south of the city centre shopping core.  It falls within Swansea's Castle ward.  The area is bounded by Brynmill to the west, Swansea Bay to the South, the River Tawe to the east and the A4067 to the north.

The area comprises a mixture of housing ranging from 1980s low-rise apartment blocks around the old South Dock to town houses arranged in quadrangles in the south eastern part of the area, which were built in the 2000s (decade).  The Marina, is unusual in that planning approval was given on condition that a significant proportion of the development be sold to Housing Associations for social housing.  The tallest building in Wales, the Meridian Quay Tower is located in the area.

History
Formerly the South Dock, during the 1980s it underwent significant brownfield re-development in the early 1980s with the building of many low rise apartment blocks in the area around the South Dock. On the site of the Sainsbury's superstore, once stood the Weaver building. Built in 1897 by the French architect François Hennebique It was used for corn storage and it was the first steel reinforced concrete building built in Europe.

Originally the city council decided to fill in the South Dock. This was done by a developer whose brother was a councillor at the local council.  Later on, the same company was paid to dig out the South Dock again to create the marina. The developer is now imprisoned in Swansea Prison.

The re-excavated South Dock was laid out into the award-winning Maritime Quarter by architect Robin Campbell, then head of Environmental Design at Swansea Council. The brief was to make the area an extension of Swansea City centre, and not a separate suburb, and to work in walk ways through the overall development being created by numerous building companies. Campbell also worked in partnership with the developers to incorporate art designed by local artists into the buildings, and the creation of an observatory. Unfortunately the accessibility of this area was not achieved. Due to the busy thoroughfare of Quay Parade/Oystermouth Road the Marina area remains very much a separate area to the city centre.

Marina

The South Dock itself now serves as marina, part of the Swansea Marina complex providing berths for privately owned leisure boats.  Sailing and sea angling schools are located in the area.

In addition to the Quay Parade road bridge just to the north, there are two pedestrian bridges linking this area to the main Swansea docks area – the Sail bridge and the lock bridge.  The Sail bridge as its name suggests is designed to look like a sail shape.  The lock bridge is a steel structure built over the Tawe barrage.  The western section of the lock bridge is a swing bridge over the lock located on the Tawe barrage.

The water areas are not fully protected by railings.  Local residents have often expressed concerns over the safety of the lack of railings and indeed, over the years, the marina has seen a number of people drowning after having fallen into the waters by accident.

Amenities
The headquarters of the local South Wales Evening Post newspaper is located here.  Beside the Evening Post building is the Associated British Ports building, now used as a five-star hotel.  Just west of the marina is a four star Marriott hotel.  A waterside walkway to the north-east of the marina is home to a few cafes, pubs and arcades. On the far western end of the Maritime quarter is the Civic Centre which houses government offices of the City and County of Swansea council.

Located in the area are:
National Waterfront Museum
Mission Gallery
Dylan Thomas Centre
Dylan Thomas Theatre
Swansea Museum
Swansea Leisure Centre
Swansea observatory
The Environment Centre

The square surrounded by the National Waterfront Museum, the old Pump House and shopping area contains a statue of Dylan Thomas.

Current developments
There are currently proposals by OpCo to construct a 5-storey 164 bedroom hotel in the land adjacent to the Aurora tower.

Plans
There are plans to redevelop the area on the west bank of the River Tawe served by the Sailbridge in a development called Sailbridge Square.  The development will include an open pedestrianised public square lined with small businesses and restaurants.

Nearest places
Swansea beach
Swansea city centre
Sandfields
Swansea docks

Gallery

References

External links
National Waterfront Museum
 Mission Gallery
Swansea Museum
Classroom in Space
An interactive, social networking and tourism web site based on the Gower Peninsula.

Districts of Swansea
Redeveloped ports and waterfronts in Wales
Swansea Bay